Charles R. Perricone (born October 10, 1960) is a Michigan politician who served in the Michigan House of Representatives from 1995 to 2000, including as Speaker of the House for his final term.

Perricone attended Kalamazoo College from 1979 to 1981, and earned a B.B.A. degree cum laude from Western Michigan University. He is a tax accountant, licensed insurance agent, and an adjunct instructor in the insurance program at Olivet College. He was a member of the Kalamazoo Township Planning Commissioner from 1991 to 1994, a former cable television host, high school football official, vice chairman of the Southwest Michigan Arthritis Association, instructor with Junior Achievement, and member of the Citizens' Hazardous Waste Committee.

References

Living people
1960 births
Western Michigan University alumni
Speakers of the Michigan House of Representatives
Politicians from Kalamazoo, Michigan
Place of birth missing (living people)
Kalamazoo College alumni
Republican Party members of the Michigan House of Representatives
20th-century American politicians